Qualification for the 2005 FIBA European Championship, commonly called FIBA EuroBasket 2005 took place between 8 September and 25 September 2004. A total of eleven teams qualified for the tournament. Hosts Serbia and Montenegro plus the top four teams from EuroBasket 2003, Lithuania, Spain, Italy and Greece qualified directly. Greece took the place of the French team, which was the fourth-placed team in EuroBasket 2003.

Format
For this edition of the FIBA EuroBasket tournament, a new qualification format was created. National squads were divided in a two-tier system. Teams in Division A competed for direct qualification to FIBA EuroBasket 2005, while teams in Division B competed for two spots on the next tournament's Division A. Those two spots would correspond to the two teams from Division A that were relegated.

Division A
Teams were split into four groups of four teams each, and one group of three teams. The competition system was that of a double round-robin with home and away games where the top two teams from each group qualified to EuroBasket 2005.
The remaining teams where split into three double round-robin groups of three teams and competed in an additional qualifying round. The best three teams from each group formed an additional round-robin group where the best team earned the last berth for EuroBasket 2005. The three bottom teams from the additional qualifying round competed in another round-robin group where the bottom-two teams were relegated to Division B for the following tournament.

Division B
Teams were split into three groups of four teams each, and one group of three teams. The competition system was that of a double round-robin with home and away games where the top teams from each group where paired in two series of home-and-away games. The winner of each series (by overall point differential if the two-game series is a split) is promoted to Division A for the next tournament.

Division A

Qualifying round

Group 1

Rules=1) Points; 2) Head-to-head results; 3) Points difference; 4) Points scored.

Group 2

Rules=1) Points; 2) Head-to-head results; 3) Points difference; 4) Points scored.

Group 3

Group 4

Rules=1) Points; 2) Head-to-head results; 3) Points difference; 4) Points scored.

Group 5

Rules=1) Points; 2) Head-to-head results; 3) Points difference; 4) Points scored.

Additional qualifying round

Group A

Rules=1) Points; 2) Head-to-head results; 3) Points difference; 4) Points scored.

Group B

Group C

Final qualifying stage

Times given below are in Central European Summer Time (UTC+2).

|}

Relegation stage

Times given below are in Central European Summer Time (UTC+2).

|}

Division B

Qualification games
All times are local.

References

qualification
2004–05 in European basketball
2005–06 in European basketball
2005